The Green Bay metropolitan statistical area, as defined by the United States Census Bureau, is a metropolitan area in northeastern Wisconsin anchored by the City of Green Bay. It is Wisconsin's fourth largest metropolitan statistical area by population. As of the 2010 Census, the MSA had a combined population of 306,241.

Counties
Brown
Kewaunee
Oconto

Cities

Principal 
 Green Bay

Metro area cities and villages with more than 10,000 inhabitants 
Allouez
Ashwaubenon
Bellevue
Suamico
De Pere
Howard

Metro area cities and villages with fewer than 10,000 inhabitants 
Algoma
Casco
Denmark
Gillett
Hobart
Kewaunee
Lena
Luxemburg
Oconto
Oconto Falls
Pulaski (partial)
Suring
Wrightstown

Unincorporated communities
Anston
Askeaton
Champion
Dyckesville
Greenleaf
Flintville
New Franken
Little Rapids
Sobieski

Towns

Brown County

Kewaunee County
Ahnapee
Carlton
Casco
Franklin
Lincoln
Luxemburg
Montpelier
Pierce
Red River
West Kewaunee

Oconto County

View at night

Demographics

As of the census of 2000, there were 282,599 people, 108,897 households, and 73,126 families residing within the MSA. The racial makeup of the MSA was 92.51% White, 0.96% African American, 1.95% Native American, 1.78% Asian, 0.02% Pacific Islander, 1.57% from other races, and 1.20% from two or more races. Hispanic or Latino of any race were 3.22% of the population.

The median income for a household in the MSA was $43,824, and the median income for a family was $51,085. Males had a median income of $34,552 versus $23,499 for females. The per capita income for the MSA was $19,752.

See also
Wisconsin census statistical areas
Political subdivisions of Wisconsin

References

 
Metropolitan areas of Wisconsin